The European Federation of Psychiatric Trainees (EFPT) is a non-profit organization for European national psychiatric trainees. It is a federation of the national psychiatric training bodies of about 35 European nations.

Organization
The governing body of the EFPT is the General Assembly, which meets annually.

Statements
EFPT produces statements that form the basis of the EFPT's work and are communicated to partner organizations.

Research and projects 
The EFPT led several research projects about :
 relationship between trainees and industry, 
 burnout among psychiatry trainees, 
 brain drain among psychiatry trainees, 
 psychotherapy training of psychiatry trainees,
It promotes a positive image of psychiatry with some videos targeting stigmatization.

References

Psychiatry organizations
1993 establishments in Belgium
Organizations established in 1993
European medical and health organizations